was a town located in Kamikawa (Teshio) District, Kamikawa Subprefecture, Hokkaido, Japan.

As of 2004, the town had an estimated population of 1,799 and a density of 3.45 persons per km2. The total area was 522.01 km2.

On September 1, 2005, Asahi was merged into the expanded city of Shibetsu.

History
1949: Asahi village was split from Kamishibetsu village (now Shibetsu city).
1962: Asahi village became a town.
2005: Asahi village merged with Shibetsu city.

Climate

References

External links
 Shibetsu official website 

Dissolved municipalities of Hokkaido